Marion Rockefeller Weber (born 1938) is the second eldest daughter of Laurance Spelman Rockefeller (1910–2004) and Mary French (1910–1997) and a fourth generation member of the Rockefeller family. Her paternal great-grandfather is Standard Oil's founder John D. Rockefeller and maternal great-grandfather is Frederick Billings, a president of Northern Pacific Railway.

Biography
Weber is a philanthropist through her Flow Fund and is the founder and director of the Arts and Healing Network, which gives the prestigious "Most Outstanding Healing Artist for the Year" award annually. Weber is quoted as saying the "Arts and Healing Network honors and supports the emergence of healing artists and recognizes them as essential catalysts for positive change." She currently resides in the San Francisco Bay Area of California.

See also
Rockefeller family
Laurance Rockefeller

References

External links 
Arts and Healing Network

Rockefeller family
Winthrop family
American philanthropists
1938 births
Living people